Dynamo Cover Pro Cycling was a proposed British professional cycling team that was set to compete in the 2016 season of the UCI Continental Circuits. The team aimed to race mainly on the European and UK circuit with races in Asia and North America during 2016 and progress towards a larger race program in 2017 and 2018. However the project collapsed in mid-December 2015, with the team's owner and main sponsor blaming a legal case against the company responsible for negotiating the team's sponsorship deals for its folding.

Announced team roster

References 

Cycling teams based in the United Kingdom
UCI Continental Teams (Europe)
Defunct cycling teams based in the United Kingdom